Mauritia maculifera, common name : the blotched cowry or reticulated cowry, is a species of sea snail, a cowry, a marine gastropod mollusk in the family Cypraeidae, the cowries.

Description
The dorsum surface of these smooth and shiny shells is generally dark brown, with distinct large bluish dots. On the edges there are large brown spots. The base is white or pale brown or pale pinkish. The aperture is long and narrow, with several dark brown teeth. This species can be distinguished by a characteristic brown columellar spot. In the living cowries the mantle is transparent, with blue sensorial papillae and may cover the entire shell.

Distribution
This quite common species occurs  in the Indian Ocean along Chagos and the Seychelles and in the Pacific Ocean (from South-East Asia, Philippines, Fiji and Micronesia through western Polynesia and Hawaii).

Habitat
As they fear the light, they start feeding at dusk mainly on sponges or coral polyps.

Subspecies
Four subspecies have been recognized :
 Mauritia maculifera andreae Erdmann & Lorenz, 2017
 Mauritia maculifera maculifera Schilder, 1932
 Mauritia maculifera martybealsi Lorenz, 2002
 Mauritia maculifera scindata Lorenz, 2002
 Mauritia maculifera hawaiiensis Heiman, 2005: synonym of Mauritia maculifera maculifera Schilder, 1932

References

  Schilder F.A. & Schilder M. (1938-1939). Prodrome of a monograph on living Cypraeidae. Proceedings of the Malacological Society of London. 23(3): 109-180
 Lorenz F. & Hubert A. (2000) A guide to worldwide cowries. Edition 2. Hackenheim: Conchbooks. 584 pp
 Burgess, C.M. (1970). The Living Cowries. AS Barnes and Co, Ltd. Cranbury, New Jersey

External links

 Barnes D.H. (1824). Notice of several species of shells. Annals of the Lyceum of Natural History of New York. 1: 131-140.
 Biolib
 Underwater

Cypraeidae
Gastropods described in 1932